Eduard Igorevich Doronin (born 23 March 1975) is a former Russian football player.

External links
 

1975 births
Living people
Russian footballers
FC Lokomotiv Nizhny Novgorod players
Russian Premier League players
FC Lada-Tolyatti players
Place of birth missing (living people)
Association football midfielders
FC Spartak-UGP Anapa players